George Drummond (1688–1766) was accountant-general of excise in Scotland and a local politician, elected Lord Provost of Edinburgh a number of times between 1725 and 1764.

Life

Drummond was the grandson or great grandson of his namesake Sir George Drummond who had been Provost of Edinburgh 1683 to 1685 and who had resided on Anchor Close on the Royal Mile in Edinburgh.

Drummond was born at Newton Castle in Blairgowrie, Perthshire. He was educated at the High School in Edinburgh and began his career as an accountant, working on the financial details of the 1707 Act of Union at 18. In 1707 he was appointed Accountant General, at age 20, of the Board of Customs, being promoted to Commissioner in 1717. 

By the 1720s, the English were attempting to reform the Scottish taxation system. Although this climate of political turmoil promoted Drummond by 1723, it also led to public demonstrations in June 1725 against the arrival of the English malt tax in Scotland. During the Malt Tax riots in Glasgow, soon to be bookseller Andrew Millar (then still an apprentice), directly challenged Drummond's authority by printing opposition material in Leith, outside the council of Edinburgh's jurisdiction.  

Drummond was a strong opponent of Jacobitism, and fought against John Erskine, the Earl of Mar, at the Battle of Sheriffmuir in 1715. He also raised a company of volunteers to try to defend the city of Edinburgh against the army of Bonnie Prince Charlie during the Jacobite rising of 1745. 

Drummond first joined the Edinburgh Town Council in 1716. He raised funds to build the Royal Infirmary, designed by William Adam in 1738, which quickly became one of the world's foremost teaching hospitals. In 1760 he was responsible for commissioning the Royal Exchange, which later became the Edinburgh City Chambers. He was also a great supporter of the University of Edinburgh, encouraging its enlargement and establishing five chairs of medicine.

Drummond is best known as the driving force behind the building of Edinburgh's 'New Town'. His aim was to overcome the unhealthy and overcrowded conditions of the Old Town. In 1766 he persuaded the Town Council to support an ambitious plan for a grand extension to the city on its north side and to hold a competition for the design. The competition was won by the young architect James Craig who was then only 21. In 1759, Drummond also began the decades-long draining of the insanitary Nor' Loch and identified the need for the North Bridge as the gateway to the New Town, laying its foundation stone in 1763. 

Drummond was also a Freemason. He was Initiated into Freemasonry in The Lodge of Edinburgh (Mary's Chapel) No.1, in 1721 and in 1739 became the Founder Master of Lodge Drummond Kilwinning from Greenock (now dormant).  He served as Grand Master Mason of the Grand Lodge of Scotland From November 1752 to November 1753. In this capacity he laid the foundation stone of the new Royal Exchange on the Royal Mile on 13 September 1753 - the building later being used as the City Chambers.

In 1722 Drummond was Initiated as a Free Gardener in the Free Gardener's Lodge at Dunfermline.

Drummond's house stood north of the city. It was bought by General John Scott after Drummond's death and redeveloped as a substantial villa known as Bellevue House or Lodge. It later was purchased as the Excise Office for Edinburgh. It stood in the centre of what is now Drummond Place which is named in honour of George Drummond.

He died in Edinburgh on 4 December 1766.

Drummond is buried in the Canongate Churchyard the burial ground of the Canongate Kirk. His name is remembered locally in Drummond Place, the street in the New Town which was developed in the location where he had owned a country house in what is now Drummond Place Gardens and Drummond Street, next to the site previously occupied by the Royal Infirmary.

Family

His daughter Jean Drummond (d.1766) married Rev John Jardine in 1744, Jardine being "second charge" minister of Tron Kirk on the Royal Mile and Dean of the Chapel Royal.

References

Alexander Murdoch, ‘Drummond, George (1687–1766)’, Oxford Dictionary of National Biography, Oxford University Press, 2004

1688 births
1766 deaths
People educated at the Royal High School, Edinburgh
People from Blairgowrie and Rattray
People of the Jacobite rising of 1715
Burials at the Canongate Kirkyard
Lord Provosts of Edinburgh
Scottish accountants
New Town, Edinburgh
Freemasons
Freemasonry in Scotland
People of the Scottish Enlightenment
Free Gardeners